Walter Lupi is an Italian guitarist, born in Milan, in 1960. He began playing the guitar at age 10, largely self-taught. Later he studied music theory, harmony and classical guitar receiving a diploma from the Conservatorio di Alessandria.

He now usually plays fingerstyle.

In search of new sounds, he experimented with using sequencer and synthesizer applied to the acoustic guitar, eventually leading to the album Spirals (1998/9) produced by Mauro Pagani.

After this experimental period, returned to his acoustic guitar sound, marked by the recording of the solo album Shorts (recorded in August 2000 at Acoustic Music Records)

External links

Articles
Review of Concert (4 Novembre 2006) Festival Guitare Issoudun by (Max Kerzan, laguitare.com)

Information
Official Homepage
Myspace page
Youtube page

1960 births
Living people
Italian guitarists
Italian male guitarists